Haff may refer to:

People
Carroll Barse Haff (1892–1947), American track and field athlete who competed in the 1912 Summer Olympics
Bergljot Hobæk Haff (1925–2016), Norwegian novel writer

Places
Am Stettiner Haff, Amt in the district of Uecker-Randow, in Mecklenburg-Vorpommern, Germany

Other
Battle of Frisches Haff
Haff disease
Holland Animation Film Festival